This is a list of members of the Council of the German Cultural Community between 1981 and 1986, following the direct elections of 1981.

In 1984, the German Cultural Community changed into the German-speaking Community, with more autonomy, including an own government.

Composition

Sources
 

List
1980s in Belgium